Preobrazhenskaya is a rural locality (a village) in Ivano-Kazansky Selsoviet, Iglinsky District, Bashkortostan, Russia. The population was 80 as of 2010. There are 5 streets.

Geography 
Preobrazhenskaya is located 31 km south of Iglino (the district's administrative centre) by road. Ivano-Kazanka is the nearest rural locality.

References 

Rural localities in Iglinsky District